Vincent Charles Marrow (born August 17, 1968) is an American football coach and former NFL tight end. He is currently the Associate Head Coach at the University of Kentucky.

Early years
Marrow played basketball and football at Cardinal Mooney High School in Youngstown, Ohio.

College career
Marrow played basketball at Youngstown State University for two years (1988–89). He transferred to the University of Toledo where he played in 11 games as a tight end in his final collegiate season. He was named to the All-Mid-American Conference second-team in 1991.

Professional career
Marrow was drafted by the Buffalo Bills in the 11th round of the 1992 NFL Draft (307th pick overall).

Coaching career
Marrow was named tight ends coach for the Omaha Nighthawks of the United Football League on May 10, 2010.

Marrow spent two years (2011–12)  as a graduate assistant at the University of Nebraska.  Under long-term acquaintance Bo Pelini, Marrow served as a tutor to the tight ends.  In 2012, Nebraska was granted a waiver from the NCAA to allow Marrow to recruit off campus while associate head coach Barney Cotton was unable to travel while recovering from surgery.

In December 2012, Marrow earned a full-time position as an assistant coach for the University of Kentucky under head coach Mark Stoops and received a promotion a year later to recruiting coordinator.

References

1968 births
Living people
American football tight ends
Youngstown State Penguins men's basketball players
Toledo Rockets football players
Buffalo Bills players
Carolina Panthers players
Frankfurt Galaxy players
Orlando Rage players
Berlin Thunder coaches
Rhein Fire coaches
Toledo Rockets football coaches
Omaha Nighthawks coaches
Nebraska Cornhuskers football coaches
Kentucky Wildcats football coaches
American men's basketball players
Basketball players from Youngstown, Ohio
Players of American football from Youngstown, Ohio